Kushnarenkovsky District (or , Kuşnaren(ko) rayonı) is an administrative and municipal district (raion), one of the fifty-four in the Republic of Bashkortostan, Russia. It is located in the northern central part of the republic and borders with Birsky District in the north, Blagoveshchensky District in the northeast and east, Ufimsky District in the east and southeast, Chishminsky District in the south, Blagovarsky District in the south and southwest, Chekmagushevsky District in the west, and with Dyurtyulinsky District in the northwest. Its administrative center is the rural locality (a selo) of Kushnarenkovo. As of the 2010 Census, the total population of the district was 27,491, with the population of Kushnarenkovo accounting for 35.9% of that number.

History
The district was established in 1930.

Administrative and municipal status
Within the framework of administrative divisions, Kushnarenkovsky District is one of the fifty-four in the Republic of Bashkortostan. The district is divided into twelve selsoviets, comprising sixty-nine rural localities. As a municipal division, the district is incorporated as Kushnarenkovsky Municipal District. Its twelve selsoviets are incorporated as twelve rural settlements within the municipal district. The selo of Kushnarenkovo serves as the administrative center of both the administrative and municipal district.

References

Notes

Sources

Districts of Bashkortostan
States and territories established in 1930